Islam in Lebanon has a long and continuous history. According to an estimate by the CIA, it is followed by 67.8% of the country's total population. Sunnis make up 31.9%, Shias make up 31.2%, with smaller percentages of Alawites and Ismailis. The Druze community is designated as one of the five Lebanese Muslim communities (Sunni, Shia, Druze, Alawi, and Ismaili), even though most Druze do not identify as Muslims, and they do not accept the five pillars of Islam.  

Under the terms of an agreement known as the National Pact between the various political and religious leaders of Lebanon, the president of the country must be a Maronite, the Prime Minister must be a Sunnite, and the Speaker of Parliament must be a Shiite.

Demographics

Note that the following percentages are estimates only. However, in a country that had last census in 1932, it is difficult to have correct population estimates.

The number of Muslims in Lebanon has been disputed for many years. There has been no official census in Lebanon since 1932. According to the CIA World Factbook, the Muslim population is estimated at around 59.5% within the Lebanese territory and of the 8.6–14 million Lebanese diaspora is believed by some to be about 20% of the total population.

The last census in Lebanon in 1932 put the numbers of Muslims (Shia 19%, Sunni 22%, Druze 7%) at 48% of the population (388,400 of 791,700). A study done by the Central Intelligence Agency (CIA) in 1985 put the numbers of Muslims (Shia 41%, Sunni 27%, Druze 7%) at 75% of the population (1,667,000 of 2,228,000).

Current political and religious issues

Although Lebanon is a secular country, family matters such as marriage, divorce and inheritance are still handled by the religious authorities representing a person's faith. Calls for civil marriage are unanimously rejected by the religious authorities but civil marriages conducted in another country are recognized by Lebanese civil authorities.

Non-religion is not recognized by the state, the Minister of the Interior Ziad Baroud made it possible in 2009 to have the religious sect removed from the Lebanese identity card. This does not, however, deny the religious authorities complete control over civil family issues inside the country.

Branches
Lebanese Muslims are divided into many branches like Shiites, Sunnis, Druze, Alawites, and Ismailis.

Shia Islam

The Lebanese Shia Muslims are around 27%–29% of the total population. Twelvers are the predominant Shia group, followed by Alawites and Ismailis. The Speaker of Parliament is always a Shi'a Muslim, as it is the only high post that Shi'as are eligible for. The Shiites are largely concentrated in northern and central Beqaa, Southern Lebanon, in south Beirut (southern parts of Greater Beirut).

Sunni Islam

The Lebanese Sunni Muslims constitute also about 27%–29%  of the total population with the Hanafi and Shafiʽi madhhab being the predominant Sunni groups. Sunni notables traditionally held power in the Lebanese state together, and they are still the only ones eligible for the post of Prime Minister Sunnis form the majority  in west Beirut, Tripoli, Sidon, Central and Western Beqaa and  hasbaya, ikleem al kharroub, Miniyeh and Danniyeh districts, and Akkar in the north. Several large Sufi orders are active in the country, including the Naqshbandi and Qadiriyya tariqas.

Druze

The Lebanese Druze constitute 5% of the population and can be found primarily in Mount Lebanon and the Shouf District. Under the Lebanese political division (Parliament of Lebanon Seat Allocation) the Druze community is designated as one of the five Lebanese Muslim communities (Sunni, Shia, Druze, Alawi, and Ismaili). Most Druze do not identify as Muslims.

See also
Religion in Lebanon
Secularism in Lebanon
Christianity in Lebanon
Shia Islam in Lebanon
Sunni Islam in Lebanon
Druze in Lebanon

References